Nabil Antonio Crismatt Abuchaibe (born December 25, 1994) is a Colombian professional baseball pitcher for the San Diego Padres of Major League Baseball (MLB). He previously played in MLB for the St. Louis Cardinals.

Career

New York Mets

On May 31, 2012, Crismatt signed with the New York Mets and made his professional debut that same season for the DSL Mets. In 19 relief appearances he was 4–0 with a 4.26 ERA. He spent 2013 with the DSL Mets where he compiled a 4–2 record and 1.33 ERA in 40.2 relief innings pitched and 2014 with the GCL Mets where he was 1–1 with a 2.25 ERA in 19 games out of the bullpen. In 2015, he pitched for the Kingsport Mets where he pitched to a 6–1 record and 2.90 ERA in 12 games (eight starts), and in 2016 he played with the Brooklyn Cyclones, Columbia Fireflies, and Binghamton Mets where he posted a combined 1–4 record and 2.47 ERA in 65.2 innings pitched. Crismatt spent 2017 with the St. Lucie Mets where he was 6–13 with a 3.95 ERA in 26 games (25 starts).

Seattle Mariners
On November 28, 2018, Crismatt signed a minor league deal with the Seattle Mariners. He split the season with the Double-A Arkansas Travelers and the Triple-A Tacoma Rainiers. He became a free agent following the 2019 season.

St. Louis Cardinals
On January 31, 2020, Crismatt signed a minor league deal with the St. Louis Cardinals. On August 17, 2020, Crismatt was selected to the active roster. He made his major league debut that day against the Chicago Cubs, throwing one scoreless inning. On October 30, 2020, Crismatt was outrighted off of the 40-man roster. He became a free agent on November 2, 2020.

San Diego Padres
On December 18, 2020, Crismatt signed a minor league contract with the San Diego Padres organization. On April 1, 2021, Crismatt was selected to the 40-man roster. In 2021, he recorded a 3.76 ERA with 71 strikeouts in  innings.

International career
Crismatt was selected to the roster for the Colombia national baseball team at the 2015 Pan American Games, the 2017 World Baseball Classic, and the 2023 World Baseball Classic.

References

External links

1994 births
Living people
Arkansas Travelers players
Baseball players at the 2015 Pan American Games
Binghamton Mets players
Binghamton Rumble Ponies players
Brooklyn Cyclones players
Columbia Fireflies players
Colombian expatriate baseball players in the United States
Dominican Summer League Mets players
Estrellas Orientales players
Gigantes de Carolina players
Colombian expatriate baseball players in Puerto Rico
Gulf Coast Mets players
Kingsport Mets players
Las Vegas 51s players
Major League Baseball pitchers
Major League Baseball players from Colombia
National baseball team players
San Diego Padres players
Sportspeople from Barranquilla
St. Louis Cardinals players
St. Lucie Mets players
Tacoma Rainiers players
Tigres del Licey players
Colombian expatriate baseball players in the Dominican Republic
Tomateros de Culiacán players
American expatriate baseball players in Mexico
Colombian expatriate baseball players in Mexico
2017 World Baseball Classic players
2023 World Baseball Classic players
Pan American Games competitors for Colombia